Rudolph the Red-Nosed Reindeer is a video game based on the 1964 television special of the same name. The game was released by Red Wagon Games for both Wii and Nintendo DS on November 9, 2010. However, the developers of the two versions differ: the Wii game was developed by High Voltage Software while the developer of the DS version is American studio Glyphic Entertainment. In this game, the players compete in four different minigames, with each game having its own motion controls. Each minigame has a time limit. Once the time limit is up, the minigame is finished. Up to two players can participate at a time. The game has faced generally negative reviews from sites such as IGN.

Gameplay

In this game, players compete in four different minigames, with each game having its own motion controls. Each minigame has a time limit. Once the time limit is up, the minigame is finished. Up to two players can participate at a time. In the first three minigames, up to 5 characters may be selected. In the final minigame, an elf may be chosen. Every time a minigame is completed, a different character may be selected. Once all four minigames have been completed, the game is over. Any of the minigames may be replayed once the story is completed.

Minigames
In the first minigame, Holiday Helper, the player bounces presents under the tree, lights and stockings onto the tree, and dolls and toys into Santa's Bag. In the second minigame, titled Toy Maker, the player paints toys. The third game, Cookie Cooking, involves the player baking cookies for Mrs. Claus. In the fourth and final minigame, Saving Christmas, the player delivers toys by dropping them onto houses.

Reception

Critical response
The game has faced generally negative reviews. In its review by IGN it was rated 1.5/10, and was criticized for its lack of gameplay and its grainy visual effects. IGN summed up their review by stating, "We love these classic claymation movies, so it’s really sad to see such a blatant cash-in on the Rudolph name. Do yourself a favor and purchase something else for the family to enjoy over the holidays, because these reindeer games are a disaster."

References

2010 video games
Adventure games
Christmas video games
High Voltage Software games
Minigame compilations
Nintendo DS games
North America-exclusive video games
Rudolph the Red-Nosed Reindeer
Video games about animals
Video games based on films
Video games based on adaptations
Video games developed in the United States
Wii games
Single-player video games